Richard D. Braatz (born July 19, 1966) is the Edwin R. Gilliland Professor at the Massachusetts Institute of Technology known for his research in control theory and its applications to chemical, pharmaceutical, and materials systems.

He has received many honors, including the Hertz Foundation Thesis Prize, the Donald P. Eckman Award from the American Automatic Control Council, the Curtis W. McGraw Research Award from the Engineering Research Council, and the Antonio Ruberti Young Researcher Prize from the Antonio Ruberti Foundation and IEEE Control Systems Society. Braatz became a member of the National Academy of Engineering in 2019. He is a Fellow of the International Federation of Automatic Control, the Institute of Electrical and Electronics Engineers, and the American Association for the Advancement of Science.

Braatz graduated from Oregon State University with a B.S. in 1988 with an undergraduate thesis on heat exchanger design supervised by Octave Levenspiel. He worked at Chevron Research and Avery Dennison before receiving his M.S. and Ph.D. in robust control from the California Institute of Technology under the direction of Professor Manfred Morari. His thesis included a proof that robust control problems are NP-hard. After a postdoctoral year at DuPont, he moved to the University of Illinois at Urbana-Champaign, where he rose to the position of Millennium Chair and Professor, with positions in Chemical and Biomolecular Engineering, Electrical and Computer Engineering, Mechanical Science and Engineering, Bioengineering, Applied Mathematics, and Computational Science and Engineering. Braatz made contributions in the areas of robust optimal control, fault detection and diagnosis, sheet and film processes, and crystallization.

After serving as a visiting scholar for a year at Harvard University, in 2010 he moved to MIT Department of Chemical Engineering, where he continues research in systems and control theory and its applications.

References

Sources 
Richard Braatz Faculty Page
Donald P. Eckman Award
Antonio Ruberti Young Researcher Prize
IEEE Control Systems Society Transition to Practice Award
Curtis W. McGraw Research Award
Hertz Foundation Thesis Prize
AACC Executive Officers
National Academy of Engineering

American chemical engineers
Living people
Control theorists
MIT School of Engineering faculty
1966 births
Members of the United States National Academy of Engineering
Fellows of the International Federation of Automatic Control
Fellow Members of the IEEE
Fellows of the American Association for the Advancement of Science